The 42nd Infantry Brigade, also known as 42 (North West) Brigade, was a brigade of the British Army.

History
The brigade first saw action during the Second Boer War.

First World War
The brigade was reformed in August 1914 during the First World War as the 42nd Brigade, raised from the first wave of men volunteering for Kitchener's Army. The 42nd Brigade was a component formation of the 14th (Light) Division and originally consisted of light infantry regiments but, as the war progressed and casualties mounted, the brigades' original battalions were replaced by non-light infantry regiments.

Order of battle
 5th (Service) Battalion, Oxfordshire and Buckinghamshire Light Infantry
 5th (Service) Battalion, King's Shropshire Light Infantry
 9th (Service) Battalion, King's Royal Rifle Corps
 9th (Service) Battalion, Rifle Brigade (Prince Consort's Own)
 42nd Machine Gun Company, Machine Gun Corps
 42nd Trench Mortar Battery
 6th (Service) Battalion, Wiltshire Regiment
 16th (Service) Battalion, Manchester Regiment
 14th (Service) Battalion, Argyll and Sutherland Highlanders

Second World War
The brigade HQ was re-formed in Britain during the Second World War on 26 July 1943, and on landing in North Africa on 25 August, was formed as a security force to protect lines of communication in North Africa. In November 1943, the brigade HQ was redesignated as the HQ of the 57th Infantry Division for deception purposes, with its battalions playing the role of brigades.

Order of battle
 30th Battalion, Royal Northumberland Fusiliers – 25 August 1943 to 30 April 1944, '170 Brigade' from 9 November 1943
 30th Battalion, Bedfordshire and Hertfordshire Regiment – 25 August 1943 to 27 July 1944, '172 Brigade' from 26 December 1943 to 27 July 1944
 30th Battalion, Duke of Cornwall's Light Infantry – 25 August 1943 to 5 May 1944
 30th Battalion, Royal Norfolk Regiment– 10 October 1943 to 20 October 1943
 30th Battalion, Green Howards – 5 November 1943 to 26 December 1943, '172 Brigade from 9 November 1943 to 26 December 1943
 31st Battalion, Suffolk Regiment – 5 November 1943 to 18 June 1944, '171 Brigade' from 9 November 1943 to 19 June 1944

The Brigade headquarters was disbanded in North Africa on 29 July 1944.

Post war
Headquarters 42 (North West) Brigade was reformed at The Castle, Chester in 1982 before relocating to Fulwood Barracks in 1986, so perpetuating the memory of the 42nd (East Lancashire) Infantry Division, and became the regional military headquarters for North West England.

The structure in 1989 was as follows:

 1st Battalion, The Cheshire Regiment
 3rd Battalion, The Light Infantry
 Duke of Lancaster's Own Yeomanry (V) - Chorley
 3rd Battalion, The Cheshire Regiment (V) - Runcorn
 4th Battalion, The Queen's Lancashire Regiment (V) - Preston
 4th Battalion, The King's Own Royal Border Regiment - Lancaster
 5th/8th Battalion, The King's Regiment - Warrington
 103rd (Lancashire) Air Defence Regiment, Royal Artillery - Liverpool
 75th Engineer Regiment, Royal Engineers (V) - Manchester
 33rd (Lancashire and Cheshire) Signal Regiment, Royal Corps of Signals
 156th (Merseyside & Greater Manchester) Transport Regiment, Royal Corps of Transport (V), Birkenhead
 207th (Manchester) General Hospital, Royal Army Medical Corps (V), Blackburn
 208th (Merseyside) General Hospital, Royal Army Medical Corps (V), Ellesmere Port

Under Army 2020, it was renamed 42nd Infantry Brigade and became the Regional Point of Command for the British Army in the region of North West England and the Isle of Man. Its headquarters were situated at Fulwood Barracks in Preston. Units included:

 2nd Battalion, Duke of Lancaster's Regiment in Weeton (rotates to British Forces Cyprus)
 2nd Battalion, Mercian Regiment in Chester
 4th Battalion, Duke of Lancaster's Regiment in Preston (Army Reserve - paired with 2nd Battalion, Duke of Lancaster's Regiment)
 4th Battalion, Mercian Regiment in Wolverhampton (Army Reserve - paired with 2nd Battalion, Mercian Regiment)

The brigade was disbanded in January 2017, being reduced in status to become the cadets-and-reservists Headquarters North West, now part of Regional Command.

References

Sources

External links
 42 (North West) Brigade - on British Army official website

42
42
Military units and formations established in the 1910s
Military units and formations disestablished in 2017